North Hertfordshire was a parliamentary constituency in Hertfordshire.  It returned one Member of Parliament (MP)  to the House of Commons of the Parliament of the United Kingdom by the first-past-the-post system.

The constituency was created for the 1983 general election, and abolished for the 1997 general election.

History
The constituency was formed from the bulk of the abolished County Constituency of Hitchin. On abolition, western areas, including Hitchin, formed part of the new County Constituency of Hitchin and Harpenden.  Remaining parts, including Letchworth, Baldock and Royston, formed the majority of the new County Constituency of North East Hertfordshire.

It was a safe Conservative seat for its entire existence. Its first MP, Ian Stewart, previously held the old marginal seat of Hitchin, and its last, Oliver Heald, currently represents North East Hertfordshire.

Boundaries
The District of North Hertfordshire wards of Arbury, Ashbrook, Baldock, Bearton, Cadwell, Grange, Highbury, Hitchwood, Hoo, Kimpton, Letchworth East, Letchworth South East, Letchworth South West, Newsells, Offa, Oughton, Priory, Royston East, Royston West, Sandon, Walsworth, Weston, and Wilbury.

The three main towns in the constituency were Hitchin, Letchworth, and Royston.

Members of Parliament

Election results

Elections in the 1980s

Elections in the 1990s

See also
List of parliamentary constituencies in Hertfordshire

Notes and references 

Parliamentary constituencies in Hertfordshire (historic)
Constituencies of the Parliament of the United Kingdom established in 1983
Constituencies of the Parliament of the United Kingdom disestablished in 1997